James Otto Newton (March 28, 1882 – August 10, 1938) was an American football and basketball coach.

Early years
Newton earned his DDS degree from Ohio State University in 1903.

Heidelberg
Newton served as the head football coach at Heidelberg University from 1918 to 1920 and, also, as the school's head men's basketball coach from 1919 to 1921.

Ohio Northern
Newton moved to Ada, Ohio to become the head football coach (1922–1923), men's basketball coach (1922–1927), and women's basketball coach (1922).

Head coaching record

Football

References

1882 births
1938 deaths
Heidelberg Student Princes football coaches
Heidelberg Student Princes men's basketball coaches
Ohio Northern Polar Bears athletic directors
Ohio Northern Polar Bears football coaches
Ohio Northern Polar Bears men's basketball coaches
Basketball coaches from Ohio
College women's basketball coaches in the United States
Ohio State University College of Dentistry alumni
People from Noble County, Ohio
Coaches of American football from Ohio